Martin William Dossett (born October 30, 1978) is a former NFL wide receiver who signed with the Green Bay Packers. He played college football & ran track at Baylor University. He has played in leagues such as NFL Europe and AF2 before playing in Corpus Christi, Texas for the Corpus Christi Hammerheads of the Intense Football League.

References

External links
 Baylor Bears bio

1978 births
Living people
People from Portland, Texas
American football wide receivers
Baylor Bears football players
Corpus Christi Hammerheads players